Sage Bank is a defunct bank formerly headquartered in Lowell, Massachusetts. Until its 2018 acquisition by Salem Five Bank, the bank operated two branches, both of which were located in Lowell.

History
The bank was established in 1885 as Lowell Co-operative Bank.

In January 2009, the bank was recapitalized though a supervisory stock conversion, converting from a mutual co-operative bank to a stock co-operative bank.

In December 2010, the bank acquired the assets of Omega Mortgage Corporation.

In 2013, the bank changed its name to Sage Bank.

In November 2014, Richard E. Bolton Jr., the president, CEO, and chairman, and Dean L. Kenney, the executive vice president and chief financial officer, both resigned after a shareholder dispute and disagreement with the direction of the bank.

In August 2018, Salem Five Bank closed its acquisition of Lowell-based Sage Bank, an entity with $140 million in assets and 68 employees.

References

External links
  (Archive)

Banks based in Massachusetts
Banks established in 1885
1885 establishments in Massachusetts
Defunct banks of the United States
Banks disestablished in 2018
2018 mergers and acquisitions